Katsuzō, Katsuzo or Katsuzou (written: 勝造 or 勝蔵) is a masculine Japanese given name. Notable people with the name include:

, Japanese ichthyologist
, Japanese aikidoka
, Japanese government official

Japanese masculine given names